Ognyan Stefanov Gerdzhikov (born 19 March 1946) is a Bulgarian politician and jurist who served as the interim Prime Minister from 27 January 2017 to 4 May 2017, following the resignation of Prime Minister Boyko Borisov and the failure of Bulgarian parties to form a government.

Biography 

He is a graduate of Sofia University, beginning his career as a lecturer at its juridical faculty in 1979. Since 1994 he has been a professor of legal studies.

Between 5 July 2001 and 4 February 2005, Gerdzhikov served as the chairman of the Bulgarian Parliament. He has been a member of Parliament twice (while affiliated with NDSV).

Gerdzhikov is a holder of the prestigious Order of Stara Planina, receiving the distinction from former president Georgi Parvanov.

In addition to his native Bulgarian, Gerdzhikov is also conversant in German and Russian. His hobbies include table tennis, football, and travelling. Gerdzhikov is married and has one child.

References

Bibliography 

|-

1946 births
Chairpersons of the National Assembly of Bulgaria
Academic staff of Sofia University
Bulgarian jurists
Living people
Members of the National Assembly (Bulgaria)
National Movement for Stability and Progress politicians
Politicians from Sofia
Prime Ministers of Bulgaria
Sofia University alumni